Noah Smith may refer to:

 Noah Smith (judge) (1756–1812), judge from Vermont during the early history of the United States
 Noah Smith (soccer) (born 2000), Australian soccer player
 Noah Smith (Home and Away), a character from the Australian television series Home and Away
 Noah Smith (writer), American economist and pundit
 Yeat (born 2000), American rapper Noah Olivier Smith

See also
 Taran Noah Smith (born 1984), American former actor